A boating magazine is a publication whose main topic is boating, new boat reviews, boat motors and watersports. They can be aimed at different water sports enthusiasts including: cruisers, fishers, power boaters, skiers, sailors, racers, regional boaters, yachters, et cetera.

Boating magazines include:
 Australian Sailing
 Boating
 Boat International
 Boating Life
 International Boat Industry
 BoatUS Magazine
 Chesapeake Bay Magazine
 The Ensign (United States Power Squadrons magazine)
 Lakeland Boating
 Northeast Boating Magazine
 On the Water
 Sea History
 Yaahting (parody)
 Yachting Yachting World WoodenBoat''

References

Boating magazines
Sports magazines

Maritime magazines